William Hore may refer to:

 William Bernie Hore, Australian rules footballer
 William Hore (Chichester MP) (fl 1420), MP for Chichester
 William Hore (died 1741) (c 1679–1741), MP for County Wexford
 William Hore (Taghmon MP) (c 1700–1746), MP for Taghmon

See also
William S. Hoar, zoologist
William Hoare (disambiguation)